The Andromeda class is a series of 12 container ships built for CMA CGM. The ships were built by Hyundai Heavy Industries in South Korea. The ships have a maximum theoretical capacity of around 11,388 twenty-foot equivalent units (TEU).

List of ships

References 

Container ship classes
Ships built by Hyundai Heavy Industries Group